Dennis K. Hays (born June 1, 1953) is an American diplomat who formerly served as the United States Ambassador to Suriname. He was confirmed by the U.S. Senate and was appointed by President Bill Clinton on March 22, 1996.

Hays received his bachelor's degree in American Studies from the University of Florida, and his master's degree in Public Administration from Harvard University's John F. Kennedy School of Government.

Hays is a career member of the Senior Foreign Service. He was first stationed at the U.S. embassy in Kingston as a vice consul and management officer. He would later serve in the Caribbean, Africa, and South America. Hays was the coordinator for Cuban Affairs from 1993 until he was appointed as Director of the Office for Mexican Affairs at the Department of State in 1996.

Hays was a recipient of a Christian Herter Award for his work as Cuba Coordinator. He also received the State Department's Superior Honor Award four times.

References

External links

1953 births
Ambassadors of the United States to Suriname
Harvard Kennedy School alumni
Living people
Place of birth missing (living people)
University of Florida College of Liberal Arts and Sciences alumni
United States Foreign Service personnel
20th-century American diplomats